Soil map is a geographical representation showing diversity of soil types and/or soil properties (soil pH, textures, organic matter, depths of horizons etc.) in the area of interest. It is typically the end result of a soil survey inventory, i.e. soil survey. Soil maps are most commonly used for land evaluation, spatial planning, agricultural extension, environmental protection and similar projects. Traditional soil maps typically show only general distribution of soils, accompanied by the soil survey report. Many new soil maps are derived using digital soil mapping techniques. Such maps are typically richer in context and show higher spatial detail than traditional soil maps. Soil maps produced using (geo)statistical techniques also include an estimate of the model uncertainty.

In the digital era, soil maps come in various digital vector and raster formats and are used for various applications in geosciences and environmental sciences. In this context, soil maps are only visualizations of the soil resource inventories commonly stored in a Soil Information System (SIS), of which the major part is a Soil Geographical Database. A Soil Information System is basically a systematic collection of complete (values of the target soil variables available for the whole area of interest) and consistent gridded or vector soil property and/or class maps with an attached report, user manual and/or metadata. A SIS is in the most cases, a combination of polygon and point maps linked with attribute tables for profile observations, soil mapping units and soil classes. Different elements of an SIS can be manipulated and then visualized against the spatial reference (grids or polygons). For example, soil profiles can be used to make spatial prediction of different chemical and physical soil properties. In the case of pedometric mapping, both predictions and simulations (2D or 3D — geographic location plus soil depth) of values are visualized and used for GIS modeling.

It is important to distinguish between the following types of soil maps:
 hand-drawn soil polygon maps representing distribution of soil types;
 simulated or predicted 2D/3D soil property maps (primary or secondary soil properties);
 simulated or predicted (2D) soil-class maps;

One should also distinguish soil maps that display primary soil attributes, i.e. the soil attributes originally described or measured in the field, and the soil inferred attributes also called secondary soil information, i.e. the properties of the soils in the context of the soil use: soil production capacity, soil reaction to certain use, soil functions, soil degradation measures etc.

See also 
Map 
Soil science 
Soil survey
Pedometric mapping
Digital soil mapping
Geographic information system (GIS)
Pedometrics

References

External links 
International Working Group on Digital Soil Mapping
International Union of Soil Sciences
 EuDASM includes more than 5,400 Soil Maps of the world European Digital Archive on Soil Maps of the World
National Soil Maps(listed by Country)

Map, soil
Map types